Diploclisia is a genus of flowering plants belonging to the family Menispermaceae.

Its native range is Southern China, Tropical Asia.

Species:

Diploclisia affinis 
Diploclisia glaucescens

References

Menispermaceae
Menispermaceae genera